Daldrup is a surname. Notable people with the surname include:

 Bernhard Daldrup (born 1956), German politician
 Ulrich Daldrup (born 1947), German politician